The 2015–16 Maine Black Bears men's basketball team  represented the University of Maine during the 2015–16 NCAA Division I men's basketball season. The Black Bears, were led by second year head coach Bob Walsh, played their home games at Cross Insurance Center and were members of the America East Conference. Maine finished the season with an 8–22 overall record and 4–12 in conference. They finished in a tie for seventh place in conference and lost in the quarterfinals of the America East tournament to Vermont.

Previous season
The Black Bears finished the season 3–27, 2–14 in America East play to finish in a tie for eighth place. They lost in the quarterfinals of the America East tournament to Albany.

Departures

Incoming Transfers

2015 incoming recruits

Roster

Schedule

|-
!colspan=9 style="background:#000050; color:#FFFFFF;"| Exhibition

|-
!colspan=9 style="background:#000050; color:#FFFFFF;"| Non-conference regular season

|-
!colspan=9 style="background:#000050; color:#FFFFFF;"| America East regular season

|-
!colspan=9 style="background:#000050; color:#FFFFFF;"| America East tournament

References

Maine
Maine Black Bears men's basketball seasons
Maine Black Bears men's b
Maine Black Bears men's b